Nova TV is a Croatian free-to-air television network launched on 28 May 2000. It was the first commercial television network with national concession in the country and from 2004 until 2018 it was fully owned by the Central European Media Enterprises. In 2018, Direct Media purchased Nova TV and Doma TV.

Overview 

As the first Croatian commercial television network, Nova TV made the Croatian TV viewers familiar with reality shows when first showing the American shows such as Survivor and Temptation Island. They were also the first television network to show The Jerry Springer Show in Croatia, although they stopped showing it in 2002. A short time later they started to produce their own talent show Story Supernova, which was then followed by the Croatian version of Pop Idol called Hrvatski idol.

The station also became notable for showing one of the first Croatian sitcoms called Naša mala klinika, which started to air in November 2004, and in early June 2005 they started to show another domestically produced sitcom called Bumerang. In 2005 Nova TV also introduced popular American TV series such as Lost and Desperate Housewives as well as reality show The Apprentice to the Croatian audience, and in the same year they were also showing the controversial domestically produced animated series Laku noć, Hrvatska. They are also known for broadcasting newer blockbusters first released in the 1990s and the 2000s (decade) as well as some less popular TV or cinema movies that are quite hard to find anywhere else in Croatia.

Currently, their program schedule usually consists of cartoons and children's program in the morning, the afternoons are generally reserved for Latin American telenovelas, foreign sitcoms and US American soap operas while the evenings begin with daily news program followed by movies and TV series or reality shows as well as domestic shows or sitcoms.

Nova TV are also notable for their live broadcasts of various sporting events such as alpine skiing and Mirko Filipović's fights. For many years, they have also been broadcasting FA Premier League matches, as well as some of the English cup matches. However, they stopped showing English football following the end of the 2006–07 season, with the Premier League now available in Croatia through RTL Televizija. In 2009, Nova TV bought the rights to show the UEFA Champions League matches played on Tuesdays until 2012. Their Champions League coverage consists of one live broadcast and the highlights of all the remaining matches of the night, but not the final, which is broadcast by HRT. In 2018, Nova TV bought all Croatia national football team fixtures live until 2028.

Dnevnik Nove TV

Dnevnik Nove TV is the main news program of the Croatian Nova TV, broadcast daily at 18:15 UTC.
, it was the second most popular news program in Croatia, closing in on Dnevnik HRT, its main competitor. The show overtook Dnevnik HRT in 2010, becoming the most watched news programme in Croatia. Since its launch in 2005, the style of the broadcast has changed little.

A minor incident occurred in 2015, when Milorad Pupovac, a vice-president of Independent Democratic Serb Party, was forced out of the programme for his speech on the removal of Cyrillic tables in Vukovar by an amendment of the City Statute, due to "being in 2015". Both sides, Serbian and Croatian, apparently condemned the incident, some likening it with the forced takeaway of the right to free speech. However, Nova TV soon issued a response in which they said that:

Nova TV's news anchor sought to focus the guest on the issue for which he was invited to the show. Given the fact that our guest continuously kept digressing off the topic, the host had to end the conversation at certain moment because [...] it was a live interview, within a show which also deals with other topics [...]. Just like many times before, Mr. Pupovac will continue being relevant and respected guest in our studios.

Currently airing

Internationally created shows currently broadcast by Nova TV (as of January 2018)

Nationally created shows currently broadcast by Nova TV (as of January 2018)

Sports broadcasting 

UEFA
UEFA Nations League
UEFA European Qualifiers road to Euro and World Cup
UEFA Friendly Matches

Previously created and shown Croatian programme
 Story Supernova Music Talents
 Showtime
 Hrvatski Idol

Cartoons
Current as of October 3, 2018. 
 PopPixie
 Winx Club 
 Elena of Avalor
 Timon & Pumbaa
 Aladdin

Former cartoons before October 3, 2018.
 Johnny Bravo
 Dexter's Laboratory
 Digimon
 Pokémon (TV series)
 The Harveytoons Show
 Transformers
 Sailor Moon
 Dragon Ball Z
 Sgt. Frog
 The Powerpuff Girls
 Mon Colle Knights
 Action Man
 Teletubbies
 Yu-Gi-Oh
 South Park
 Eon Kid
 Dora the Explorer
 Shaman King
 Bob the Builder
 Thomas and Friends

References

External links

 
Dnevnik.hr 

Central European Media Enterprises
Television channels in Croatia
Television channels and stations established in 2000
2000 establishments in Croatia
Croatian-language television stations